The 17th running of the Tour of Flanders for Women, a women's cycling race in Belgium, was held on 18 October 2020, serving as the 11th event of the 2020 UCI Women's World Tour. Chantal van den Broek-Blaak of the Netherlands won the race, finishing just over a minute ahead of Amy Pieters.

The race was originally scheduled on 5 April 2020, but was postponed due to the COVID-19 pandemic. Because of the unprecedented intensity of the October campaign, the event is reduced by 20 km, cutting the Muur van Geraardsbergen from the route, bringing the distance to 135 km.

Teams
Originally, eight UCI Women's WorldTeams and sixteen UCI Women's Continental Teams were set to compete in the race. Due to positive COVID-19 tests,  and  decided to pull out of the race.   was forced to pull out of the race after sponsor Paule Ka failed to fulfill their financial responsibilities forcing the team to fold on 16 October.

UCI Women's WorldTeams

 
 
 
 
 
 
 

UCI Women's Continental Teams

Results

See also
 2020 in women's road cycling

References

2020
Tour of Flanders for Women
Tour of Flanders for Women
October 2020 sports events in Belgium
Cycling events postponed due to the COVID-19 pandemic